Edith Young  (10 September 1882 – 10 February 1974), was an Irish suffragist organiser and activist.

Life
Edith Mary O'Connor was born on 10 September 1882 to John O'Connor, a clerk in the Four Courts, and Lizzey Morrissy in Dalkey, County Dublin. Young married Joseph Samuel Young on 25 November 1902. She was a Catholic and he was a Protestant, a mineral-water manufacturer. They married in the Church of Ireland parish church, St George's of Dublin. From then on Young lived in Galway.

Suffrage activism
Young was involved in various groups from her time in Galway, by 1911 publicly a member of the Irish Women's Franchise League. Her husband was an Urban District Councillor and Young worked to secure supporting resolutions for the 1911 parliamentary conciliation bill. Young's husband spoke in council against the system which allowed women to pay rates but denied them a vote in national elections while any man, rate payer or not, was entitled to one. The local solution was to endorse the women's vote if they qualified through property values of a minimum of £10 and as long as they were not married.

Galway suffragists were considered conservative and middle class which spoke to their preferred solutions despite being mobilized by this typically more militant group. The support died away somewhat when the conciliation bill failed and these more militant suffragists began using illegal methods of activism. Young established a non militant suffragist society in Galway representing the more moderate wing. She was elected president of the Connaught Women's Franchise League, part of the Irish Women's Suffrage Federation. The organisation concentrated on education and propaganda through newspapers and monthly meetings. Young held these in her home. They convinced opposing newspapers to give them regular space for coverage of the issues including papers by the members read at the society meetings. Young often shared the platform with leading English suffragists such as Christabel Pankhurst.

Other concerns
In 1914 the group protested education bills which included unequal pay for women teachers and did not provide for women inspectors for the girls schools. Young believed in the broader feminist sphere than just working for the vote and worked on the committee for the Women's National Health Association with Lady Aberdeen. Young performed on stage and was known for her involvement in the arts, usually through fund raising and charity work. During the First World War the women's vote took a back seat to supporting the war effort and Young was active in the Galway War Fund Association. She remained a prominent worker for charities and social activism.  In 1920 Young became the first woman to be elected as a Poor Law Guardian in the city. She remained in Galway until some years after her husband's death in the 1958.

At that point Young returned to live in Dublin where she died on heart failure in 1974.

References

1882 births
1974 deaths
Irish suffragists
People from County Dublin
People from Galway (city)
Irish women in politics
Irish women's rights activists